Bryan West (born 7 June 1948) is a former  international rugby union and rugby league player.

He was capped eight times as a flanker for England between 1968 and 1970.

West was selected for the 1968 British Lions tour to South Africa but did not play in any of the international matches against .

He played club rugby for Northampton, and in 1970 moved north to play rugby league for Wakefield Trinity (Heritage № 767).

Bryan West was a teacher at Trinity School in Northampton.

Bryan West was games master at St. Olave's Grammar School, Orpington.

Bryan West taught with his wife Jude West at The Continental School (Conti), now British International School of Jeddah, in Jeddah, Saudi Arabia.

References

1948 births
Living people
Alumni of Loughborough University
British & Irish Lions rugby union players from England
England international rugby union players
English rugby league players
English rugby union players
Loughborough Students RUFC players
Northampton Saints players
Rugby league players from Northampton
Rugby union players from Northampton
Rugby union flankers
Wakefield Trinity players